Khulna Public College or KPC, formerly known as Sundarban Boys' Public School and College, is an autonomous educational institution directly administered by the Ministry of Education in Boyra, Khulna, Bangladesh. It offers education for 3rd through 12th grade. It is an educational institution only for boys. In 2015, KPC was named The Best Digital Educational Institution of Khulna zone.

Administration 
The college is governed by a Board of Governors chaired by the Secretary of the Ministry of Education of The People's Republic of Bangladesh. KPC offers education in two shifts: morning shift (8.00 am–12.30 pm) and day shift (1.00 pm–5.30 pm). The head of the college administration is the Principal and there are two Vice Principals in each of the shifts.

Board of Governors
 President: The Secretary, Department of Secondary and Higher Education, Ministry of Education (Bangladesh), Government of the People's Republic of Bangladesh
 Vice-President: The Divisional Commissioner, Khulna Division
Members:
 Additional Secretary (Administration), Ministry of Finance (Bangladesh), Government of the People's Republic of Bangladesh
 Commissioner, Khulna Metropolitan Police (KMP)
 Chairman, Board of Intermediate and Secondary Education, Jessore
 Chief Engineer, Directorate of Education Engineering
 Deputy Commissioner, Khulna
 Director (College & Administration), Directorate of Secondary and Higher Education, Dhaka
 Representative of the Honorable Mayor, Khulna City Corporation
 Executive Engineer, Directorate of Education Engineering
 Education-interested Member
 One from the Vice Principals, Khulna Public College
 Two Teacher Representatives of Khulna Public College
 Secretary of the members: The Principal, Khulna Public College

Principals of Khulna Public College

Present Principal 
Lt. Col. Abdul Moqtader, AEC

Present Teachers

Education 
Khulna Public College offers primary, secondary and higher secondary education in Bengali. After grade 5, students take the Primary Education Completing exam (PEC); after grade 8, they take the Junior School Certificate (JSC); after grade 10, they take the Secondary School Certificate (equivalent to O Levels); and after grade 12 they take the Higher Secondary (School) Certificate (equivalent to the high school diploma in the United States and A Levels).

Curriculum 
The college follows the national education curriculum of Bangladesh. Classes in computing are compulsory until grade 8. Students of secondary (9 and 10) and higher secondary (11 and 12) classes select one of three major concentrations: Humanities, Business Studies or Science.

Academic performance 
Primary Education Completing (PEC) exam results from 2012 to 2017

Junior School Certificate (JSC) exam results from 2012 to 2017

Secondary School Certificate results from 2007 to 2018:

Higher Secondary Certificate results from 2007 to 2012:

Campus 

Khulna Public College is located on a 5.3482-acre campus in a residential neighbourhood. The campus consists of student dormitories, individual residences for staff, a mosque, academic and administration buildings, gardens, and a playground. The academic buildings include classrooms, a library containing 5,824 volumes, laboratories for biology, chemistry, physics, geography, psychology and a modern computer lab. There is a Shaheed Minar in the college premises which has been sculpted to commemorate the sacrifice of the martyrs of the Language Movement of 1952. This exceptional Shaheed Minar has been designed by architect Al Masum Billah, who is an ex-student of this institution.

Co-curricular and extra-curricular activities 
KPC puts special emphasis on literary and cultural activities. A special class named CTP ( Class Teacher's Period ) is held on every Wednesday in every class with a view to publishing the latent talents of the students.

Cultural Week 
Every year, the college organizes an annual cultural week having competitions on debate, recitation, music, drama, art, story telling and so on. Talented students are rewarded with attractive gifts and prizes. .

Special Day Celebration 
The college arranges various programs on International Mother Language Day (21 February), Pohela Boishakh, Independence Day, Victory Day with a view to informing the student about the significance of the days. Beside these, every year KPC day is celebrated on 20 January as it is the establishment day of the college.

External Competitions 
The students of KPC are continuously making success and representing the college with glorious achievements. The extraordinary talented students participate in Math Olympiad, Biology Olympiad, National Education Week, Creative Talent Hunt etc. competitions and bringing reputations for the college.

Sports 
Sports is a major focus of college life. Inter-class cricket and football tournaments are held every year. The college also hosts indoor tournaments in the hostels. Sports week is held in January and includes running, long jump, high jump, shot put, and weight throwing, javelin, and discus events.

Publications 
The college publishes an annual magazine, Protyasha (expectations), with special publications to commemorate major events.

Prefectorial Board 
The college has a tradition of structuring a prefectorial every year. The board is mainly to represent the students.

Prefectorial Board 2020

Prefectorial Board 2020

Uniform 

The color white has been a unique symbol for the KPCians. White is the symbol of freshness as well as peace. Student are to wear white shirts and white pants. Belts and shoes should be black in color and white shoes for physical activities. Beside these, the students are given epaulettes for identifying their classes and ID cards, name-tags for personal identification. The epaulettes for grades 3–6 are 1.25-inch wide, and those for grades 7–12 are 1.5-inch wide.

Silver Jubilee 
20 January 2012 was the silver jubilee of Khulna Public College and was marked by a reunion.

31 Years Celebration and Re-union
The 31 year celebration and Re-union festival was held on 19 and 20 January 2018. The campus had been full with present and ex students of KPC. The cultural programs were much enjoyable with Nagarbaul James (musician) and many other artists.

Photo gallery

See also 
 List of educational institutions in Khulna

References 

1987 establishments in Bangladesh
Educational institutions established in 1987
Schools in Khulna District
Universities and colleges in Khulna District